Darryl Andrew Kile (December 2, 1968 – June 22, 2002) was an American professional baseball starting pitcher. He pitched from 1991 to 2002 for three Major League Baseball (MLB) teams, primarily for the Houston Astros. Kile was known for his sharp, big-breaking curveball. He died at the age of 33 of coronary artery disease in 2002 in Chicago, where he and the St. Louis Cardinals were staying for a weekend series against the Chicago Cubs. He was the first active major league player to die during the regular season since 1979, when the New York Yankees' Thurman Munson died in a plane crash.

Early life 
Kile was born on December 2, 1968, in Garden Grove, California, near Angel Stadium. He attended Norco High School in Norco, California, where his awkward frame and low pitch velocity — his four-seam fastball topping out at  — meant that he was mostly overlooked by college recruiters and scouts. In 1987, after graduating from Norco, Kile enrolled at Chaffey Junior College in Rancho Cucamonga, California, and joined their college baseball team as a walk-on.

Houston Astros
Kile was selected by the Houston Astros in the 30th round of the 1987 Major League draft. Having been successful with the Tucson Toros, the Astros' AAA club in the Pacific Coast League, Kile entered the majors in 1991, going 7–11 in 22 starts. In his first major league start on April 24, 1991, Kile had a no-hitter going when he was lifted after six innings by manager Art Howe, who wanted to protect the 22-year-old rookie's arm. Kile's breakthrough year came in 1993 when he went 15–8 with a 3.51 earned run average and made the All-Star team. On September 8, Kile pitched a no-hitter against the New York Mets. He pitched seven seasons with the Astros, mostly as a starter. Another strong season was 1997, when he went 19–7, compiled a 2.57 ERA, made the All-Star team again, threw a career-high  innings, and pitched four shutouts. He finished fifth in voting for the NL Cy Young Award. Kile made his first postseason appearance in Game 1 of the 1997 National League Division Series against the Atlanta Braves, giving up only two hits but suffering a hard-luck 2–1 loss. Atlanta swept Houston in the best-of-five series.

Colorado Rockies and St. Louis Cardinals
In 1998, Kile signed with the Colorado Rockies as a free agent. Kile suffered control problems, allowing hitters to lay off his curveball. After two seasons in which he was a combined 21–30 and posted ERAs of 5.20 and 6.61, Kile was traded to the Cardinals. In his first season with St. Louis, Kile went 20–9, becoming the first Cardinal pitcher since John Tudor and Joaquín Andújar in 1985 to win 20 games in a season. He made his third All-Star team and again finished fifth in NL Cy Young Award voting. He earned the first playoff victory of his career in Game 2 of the 2000 NLDS against Atlanta, but suffered two losses in the NL Championship Series, which the Cardinals lost to the Mets in five games.

Kile went 16–11 in 2001, and the Cardinals made the playoffs again, losing to the eventual world champion Arizona Diamondbacks in the NLDS. Kile was the starting pitcher for Game 3 and received a no-decision. Kile threw  innings and compiled a 3.09 ERA that season, despite having an injured shoulder which required surgery after the Cardinals were eliminated from the playoffs. He spent the offseason rehabilitating and was ready for the start of the 2002 season. In 12 seasons as a major league pitcher, Kile never went on the disabled list.

On June 18, Kile pitched in an interleague game against the Anaheim Angels, scattering six hits over  innings, allowing one run. He exited the game in the eighth inning to a standing ovation. Kile and the Cardinals won the game, 7–2, and moved into first place in the NL's Central Division, a spot they held for the rest of the 2002 season.

Personal life 
Kile proposed to his wife, Flynn, in 1991, when they were both 22 years old. They were married on January 11, 1992. He and his family spent the baseball offseason in Englewood, Colorado.

Death 
On June 22, 2002, during pregame warmups for what would have been a day game in Chicago against the rival Cubs, team personnel noted Kile's absence. Hotel staff entered Kile's room and discovered him in his bed, under the covers, dead of a heart attack. An autopsy determined that the cause of death was a 90% blockage in two coronary arteries. Kile's death came four days after the death of longtime Cardinal broadcaster Jack Buck.

The details leading up to and following Kile's death are detailed to some degree in Buzz Bissinger's book, Three Nights in August. An entire chapter is dedicated to Kile.

Cubs catcher Joe Girardi announced at Wrigley Field that the afternoon's game versus the Cardinals had been cancelled, though he did not announce that the cancellation was prompted by Kile's death. Girardi tearfully gave the news at 2:37 pm CDT, broadcast regionally on Fox: "Excuse me. I thank you for your patience. We regret to inform you because of a tragedy in the Cardinal family, that the commissioner has cancelled the game today. Please be respectful. You will find out eventually what has happened, and I ask that you say a prayer for the Cardinals' family." The game was rescheduled and made up later in the year on August 31, a 10–4 Cardinal defeat. Jason Simontacchi, who pitched for the Cardinals, was visibly emotional during the game since Kile was a mentor to him. Later that season, when the Cardinals clinched the Central Division championship in a game against the Astros, teammate Albert Pujols carried Kile's #57 jersey, on a hanger, to the celebration on the field. Kile was survived by his wife, Flynn, his twins, daughter Sierra and son Kannon, and son Ryker.

Memorial

The Cardinals honored Kile by placing a small "DK 57" sign in the home bullpen. This sign was carried over to the new Busch Stadium and remains today. The team wrote "DK 57" on their hats. The team put chalk and markers in the Busch Stadium concourses so fans could write similar messages on their caps. In the All-Star Game, Cardinals pitcher Matt Morris wrote DK 57 on his hands and held them up when they announced his name in honor of his fallen teammate and close friend.

Since Kile's death, the Astros and Rockies have not assigned number 57 to another player. The Cardinals were the first of Kile's former teams to re-issue the number, doing so in 2021, giving it to pitcher Zack Thompson during spring training. Thompson wore the number during his major league debut in 2022, nearly twenty full years after Kile's death.

The Astros honored Kile with a memorial plaque that hangs along the left field wall at Minute Maid Park under the 1997 Central Division Championship banner, the last season Kile played for Houston before signing with Colorado. The Rockies have a memorial near the bullpens. It is circular, says "DK 57", and is on pinstripes.

In 2003, the Darryl Kile Good Guy Award was established and is presented annually to the Astros player and Cardinals player who best exemplify Kile's traits of "a good teammate, a great friend, a fine father and a humble man". The winners are selected, respectively, by the Houston and St. Louis chapters of the Baseball Writers' Association of America. The first recipients of the award were Jeff Bagwell and Mike Matheny of the Astros and Cardinals, respectively.

Kile was given an exemption by the Baseball Writers' Association of America and placed on the ballot for the Baseball Hall of Fame in 2003. With seven votes, he was eliminated from future BBWAA ballot consideration.

See also

 Houston Astros award winners and league leaders
 List of baseball players who died during their careers
 List of Colorado Rockies team records
 List of Houston Astros no-hitters
 List of Major League Baseball career hit batsmen leaders
 List of Major League Baseball no-hitters
 St. Louis Cardinals award winners and league leaders

References

Further reading
  Contains a chapter about Kile. See Excerpt at National Public Radio.

External links

 Darryl Kile Profile and Career Highlights - Baseballbiography.com
 Cardinals' hurler Kile dead at 33 ESPN
 Transcript of press conference following Kile's death
 "Death and life at the ballpark", Salon.com, 24 June 2002
 "The Daily Prospectus: Darryl Kile", Baseball Prospectus, 24 June 2002
 Boxscore for Kile's last game
 History: Tributes: Darryl Kile (December 2, 1968 – June 22, 2002). MLB.com. MLB Advanced Media, L.P.

1968 births
2002 deaths
Baseball players from California
Chaffey Panthers baseball players
Colorado Rockies players
Columbus Mudcats players
Gulf Coast Astros players
Houston Astros players
Major League Baseball pitchers
National League All-Stars
Navegantes del Magallanes players
American expatriate baseball players in Venezuela
People from Garden Grove, California
Sportspeople from Orange County, California
St. Louis Cardinals players
Tucson Toros players